Renauld II, Count of Nevers and Auxerre (died 1089) was the son of William I of Nevers, Count of Nevers and Ermengarde of Tonnerre.

He married Ida, daughter of Artald V, Count of Forez. They had a child:
Ermengarde of Nevers, who married Miles, Sire of Courtenay, son of Jocelin de Courtenay and Isabel, daughter of Guy I of Montlhéry.

Later he married Agnes of Beaugency. They had:
 William II, Count of Nevers, d.1149
 Robert

References

1089 deaths
Counts of Nevers
Year of birth unknown 
11th-century French people
Medieval French nobility